Bone Thugs-n-Harmony (formerly known as B.O.N.E. Enterprises) is an American hip hop group composed of rappers Bizzy Bone, Wish Bone, Layzie Bone, Krayzie Bone, and Flesh-n-Bone. The group was signed to fellow American rapper Eazy-E‘s Ruthless Records in late 1993, when they debuted with their EP Creepin on ah Come Up. The EP included their breakout hit single "Thuggish Ruggish Bone". In 1995, the group released its second album E. 1999 Eternal, which included hits "1st of tha Month" and "East 1999". Their hit song "Tha Crossroads", a tribute to then-recently deceased mentor Eazy-E, won a Grammy Award in 1997. 

The Art of War, the group's third album, was released in 1997. In 2000, BTNHResurrection reached platinum status in the US in one month, while 2002's Thug World Order received more moderate sales and promotion, going gold and peaking at  3 on the Top R&B/Hip-Hop Albums chart. Following that album, the group went on hiatus from their label and released their sixth studio album, Thug Stories, independently in 2006. In 2007, they had another major-label release, Strength & Loyalty, on American producer Swizz Beatz's label Full Surface Records. Bone Thugs-n-Harmony returned with their 2010 album Uni5: The World's Enemy, released by their own record label, BTNH Worldwide, with distribution by Warner Bros.

The group is regarded as one of the greatest hip hop acts of all time. Bone Thugs-n-Harmony is the only group that has worked with renowned American rappers 2Pac, the Notorious B.I.G., Eazy-E, and Big Pun while they were all still alive. About.com ranked them  12 on its list of the 25 Best Rap Groups of All Time, and MTV called them "the most melodic hip-hop group of all time."

Due to conflicts within the group, longtime members Krayzie Bone and Wish Bone officially left the group in April 2011 to work with their independent label The Life Entertainment.  They later returned, officially re-unifying the group. In August 2013, however, Layzie Bone announced that he was stepping aside to work more on his solo career. In the same month, BTNH signed with eOne Entertainment (formerly known as Koch Records), with whom they had previously partnered to release 2006's Thug Stories. Layzie Bone has since re-united with the group, and they toured in 2018.

History

1993: B.O.N.E. Enterprise early years
Formed in Cleveland, Ohio in 1991, the group was originally called "Band Aid Boys". They then formed B.O.N.E. Enterpri$e, which consisted of four members—Krayzie Bone, Layzie Bone, Bizzy Bone, and Wish Bone (all except for Flesh-n-Bone)—and recorded an album titled Faces of Death in the studio of their then-mentor, Kermit Henderson on his indie label Stoney Burke in 1993. Like so many aspiring rappers around the country, they put in calls to executives at record companies, hoping to find someone who would listen. In hopes of securing a record deal, the group was given an audition over the phone, receiving an unfulfilled promise from rapper Eazy-E to call them back. Determined to reach him, they scrounged together the money for one-way bus tickets to Los Angeles. They left for a three-day Greyhound trek and spent four months on the city streets, putting in frequent calls to find him. Nothing came of their search except the news that Eazy-E was, in fact, on his way to Cleveland for a show.

The quartet returned to Ohio, where Diego Blak (born Diego Hodge), a marketer and promoter who had been co-executive producer of Faces of Death, introduced them to Eazy-E at a concert he promoted in Compton. There, on November 2, 1993, they auditioned for Eazy in his dressing room; Krayzie performed his verse of "Flow Motion" from the Faces of Death album, and Eazy was impressed. B.O.N.E Enterpri$e then traveled back to Los Angeles after the Cleveland show to seal the deal. At this point, Eazy renamed them Thugs-n-Harmony, but as they wanted to keep the Bone name, they made their name Bone Thugs-n-Harmony. Eazy signed the group (minus Flesh-n-Bone) to his label Ruthless Records.

1994: Creepin on ah Come Up
Released in June 1994, Creepin on ah Come Up was Bone Thugs-n-Harmony's debut with Ruthless. The album's subject matter was focused almost entirely on violent criminal activity. Peaking at  12 on the Billboard Top 200 Albums chart and  2 on the Top R&B/Hip-Hop Albums chart, it included the hit singles "Thuggish Ruggish Bone" and "Foe tha Love of $", the second of which featured a verse by Eazy-E. "Thuggish Ruggish Bone" peaked at  20 on the Billboard Hot 100 chart and  2 on the Hot Rap Tracks chart, and "Foe tha Love of $" peaked at  39 on the Hot 100 and  4 on Rap Tracks. After a slow start that saw the album's success limited to gangsta rap audiences, it broke through to the mainstream. The EP marked a major change in style for the group, as they now fully embraced the G-funk common in West Coast hip hop of the time. Beats were supplied by DJ Yella, Rhythum D, and Kenny McCloud, and it was the group's first collaboration with newcomer producer DJ U-Neek, who would craft the group's signature sound by producing the majority of their next two albums. For over a year, Eazy-E nurtured their career, continuing to serve as their executive producer and teaching them the business skills he had taught himself over the years. The growing relationship was cut short, however, when Eazy-E died on March 26, 1995, from complications from AIDS-related pneumonia. Briefly, the young rappers thought they had lost everything with the loss of their friend and mentor. However, the group's potential was apparent, and Ruthless Records continued to support them.

1995–96: E. 1999 Eternal
In 1995, the group's second album, E. 1999 Eternal, was released. It included the singles "1st of tha Month", which peaked at  12 on the Hot 100 and  4 on Hot Rap Tracks, and "Tha Crossroads", which reached  1 on both the Hot 100 and Hot Rap Tracks charts. The album generally saw positive reviews from critics as Bone had diversified its content and musical style. Critics were particularly intrigued by the album due to Bone Thugs-n-Harmony's ability to reduce the banality associated with gangsta rap in their music at a time when the subgenre had become exceedingly cliché. A considerable portion of the album's concept was built upon violent subject matter, yet they also incorporated deeper themes, as its songs dealt with more spirituality and occult mysticism. The album was produced by DJ U-Neek (with co-production from Tony C. and Kenny McCloud). E. 1999 Eternal also introduced Bone's trademark tracks devoted entirely to the use of marijuana. The album name originated from one of the street names of a corner (E. 99th street and St. Clair) that was a familiar hangout to Bone members, as well as Eazy-E's album Eternal E. Naming it after Eazy-E's album was just another way of showing respect and tribute to the rapper who had helped them reach success. Also in 1995, Flesh-n-Bone would become the first member of the group to release a debut album, titled T.H.U.G.S, which was certified gold by the RIAA. In 1996, due to their success, the Cleveland clan established their own label, Mo Thugs Records, and released the Family Scriptures compilation album to introduce many of the Cleveland-based and other artists whom they were developing. E. 1999 Eternal is the group's most commercially successful album; it has been certified 4x platinum by the RIAA.

There were plans for Bone Thugs-n-Harmony to collaborate with West Coast rapper 2Pac on a studio album titled One Nation. The project brought hip hop artists from all areas of the American map such as Boot Camp Clik, OutKast, Scarface, E-40, and more. However, 2Pac was shot and killed in September 1996 so the album never came into fruition. Bootlegs of songs produced while 2Pac was still alive have been distributed.

1997–2001: The Art of War and BTNHResurrection
In 1997, the group released the double-disc set The Art of War. Bone explored a variety of subjects and styles, with focus on God and family and an overall ambient, mellow sound. The group incorporated violent lyrics, however, with a large portion of the album dedicated to what they labeled "clones" who claimed Bone had stolen their quick-tongued rapping style and vice versa. The album had been rumored to be titled "DNA Level C" which is Cleveland backwards. The single "Look into My Eyes" appeared on the soundtrack of the film Batman & Robin. It peaked at  4 on the Hot 100 and  2 on the Hot Rap Tracks chart. "If I Could Teach the World", the other single from The Art of War, peaked at  20 on the Hot 100 and  3 on the Hot Rap Tracks, and won an American Music Award. The album also included "Thug Luv" with Tupac Shakur. The group's promotional efforts were dampened by the absence of Bizzy Bone from the album's videos and from large portions of the ensuing tour and other public appearances. This absence eventually fueled rumors of a break-up.

In 2000, Bone Thugs-n-Harmony released BTNHResurrection, featuring the single "Resurrection (Paper, Paper)", which peaked on the Hot R&B/Hip-Hop Songs chart at  52. The album's first half featured a slew of hardcore and dark tracks, with the second half being considerably more introspective and soft. Other singles from the album, including "Can't Give it Up", failed to crack the Billboard Hot 100, and the big-budget video for "Change the World" failed to receive any rotation. This was their first group album to prominently feature Flesh-n-Bone, whose presence had been limited on previous releases because he had never signed with the group's label, Ruthless Records. Flesh was convicted for assault with a firearm and criminal possession of a weapon in June 2000. Pleading guilty, Flesh was sentenced to 11 years in prison.

The group again began having public disputes with Bizzy Bone. Bizzy Bone abstained from promoting BTNHResurrection because he felt that Ruthless Records owed him money. He dropped a million-dollar lawsuit he had filed against Sony Music and Loud Records in exchange for a termination of his Sony contract. Three members of Bone Thugs-n-Harmony released solo albums in 2001: Bizzy Bone with The Gift, Layzie Bone (under the name L-Burna) with Thug by Nature, and Krayzie Bone with Thug on da Line.

2002–2006: Thug World Order and Thug Stories
In 2002, the group released Thug World Order. This album, comprising what were described “politically slanted” songs, saw a drastic change in subject matter and tone for the group. The lyrics were almost completely void of any violence, while a larger number of tracks focused on the group itself. In contrast, several songs originally intended to be included on the album that were leaked after its release portrayed a much different album. The album debuted at  12 on the Billboard 200. The first single released from the album was "Money, Money" and the second was "Get Up & Get It", featuring 3LW. The third single, "Home", which featured Phil Collins performing part of his song "Take Me Home", peaked at  33 on the Rhythmic Top 40, impacting the charts in a number of countries, most notably the United Kingdom. Bizzy Bone was expelled from the group in January 2003, leaving only 3 active members: Krayzie Bone, Layzie Bone, and Wish Bone. Thug World Order was also Bone Thugs-n-Harmony's final album with Ruthless Records.

Thug Stories, Bone Thugs-n-Harmony's seventh album, was recorded on Koch Records and released on September 19, 2006. It marked the first time Bone Thugs-n-Harmony had recorded as a trio since they released an internet-only EP album called Bone 4 Life in September 2005. Thug Stories featured a slightly more mature style, and the group leaned more heavily towards its harmonic roots than its "thug" origins. The album sold 38,000 in its first week and peaked at  25 on the Billboard 200 and  1 on the Independent Albums chart.

2007: Strength & Loyalty and T.H.U.G.S.
Originally to be titled The Bone Thugs Story, Strength & Loyalty was released on May 8, 2007 on Interscope Records imprint Full Surface Records. Being their first major album after an absence of nearly five years, the album debuted at  2 on the Billboard 200, and  1 on iTunes and the Billboard urban music charts. The album contains guest appearances by Mariah Carey, the Game, will.i.am, Akon, Twista, Bow Wow, Yolanda Adams, and Felecia. Producers on the album included Swizz Beatz, Akon, Pretty Boy, Bradd Young, DJ Toomp, Jermaine Dupri, will.i.am, and others. The executive producer of the album was Swizz Beatz. The first single was "I Tried", which was their first top-10 hit in 10 years, peaking at number 6 on the U.S. Billboard Hot 100. The second single was "Lil Love", which failed to reach the success of its predecessor. The album has been certified gold by the RIAA.

2007 also saw the release of the semi-autobiographical film I Tried, directed by Rich Newey, which explored what might have happened to Bone Thugs-n-Harmony had they not gotten their break with Eazy-E. Layzie, Krayzie, and Wish Bone starred in the film, playing themselves. Also in 2007, Bone Thugs-n-Harmony won the American Music Award for Favorite Rap/Hip-Hop Band, Duo or Group.

T.H.U.G.S., an album featuring previously unreleased, largely remixed Bone Thugs-n-Harmony songs that hadn't made the final cut of BTNHResurrection and Thug World Order, was released on November 13, 2007 by their former record label Ruthless Records. Although the album embodies old tracks, there are some notable changes: new beats, distorted production, voice manipulation, and new song titles. The sole single off the album was "Young Thugs", which was accompanied by a newly filmed music video featuring Krayzie, Layzie, Bizzy, and Wish.

In November 2007, Layzie Bone confirmed that he had completed Bone Brothers III with Bizzy Bone, spurring speculation about a full Bone reunion. In a video interview, Krayzie Bone stated that they all wanted to reunite, but that record label issues might prevent an official reunion.

After nearly a decade of incarceration, Flesh-n-Bone was released from prison on July 13, 2008. In an interview, Bizzy confirmed his return, the group having reunited in time for Flesh's release.

2010–2013: Uni5: The World's Enemy and The Art of War: World War III
Bone Thugs-n-Harmony's five members officially returned with their new album Uni5: The World's Enemy, released on May 4, 2010 by their own record label BTNH Worldwide, with distribution by Warner Bros. Uni5 also marks the return of long-time Bone collaborator DJ U-Neek, who was absent from 2007's Strength & Loyalty but had produced for the group throughout their career, including hits "Thuggish Ruggish Bone" and "Tha Crossroads". They released the singles "See Me Shine", featuring Jay Rush and Lyfe Jennings, and "Rebirth", featuring Thin-C, a member of the Mo Thugs. A third single, "Meet Me in the Sky", was released on March 22.

Throughout 2011, Krayzie Bone, Bizzy Bone, and Layzie Bone spoke about many projects coming in 2012. Those projects were to include an anniversary album featuring all five members; a Bizzy/Krayzie duet album; and compilation albums of unreleased Bone Thugs-n-Harmony material from the mid to late 1990s and 2000s, prospectively titled Lost Archives Vol. 1. The group put their differences aside to reunite and belatedly mark their 20th anniversary at the Rock the Bells festival series of summer 2012.

During Summer 2012, West Coast rapper Game sampled Bone Thugs-n-Harmony's "1st Of Tha Month" on his posse cut "Celebration", with the group's blessing. Game also posted a picture on Twitter showing the word "bone" constructed out of cannabis. He later confirmed that he was working in the studio with Bone Thugs-n-Harmony on a remix of "Celebration" for his album Jesus Piece.

In early November 2013, Krayzie Bone told HipHopDX that the Art of War III album would feature only Layzie, Bizzy, and Flesh-n-Bone and that neither he nor Wish Bone had recorded any material for that album. However, Krayzie and Wish both appeared on the album in the form of previously unreleased tracks that had been cut from Uni5: The World's Enemy. The Art of War: World War III was released on December 10, 2013.

2014–present: New album, New Waves
On July 15, 2014, it was announced that Bone Thugs-n-Harmony would release their final album in 2015. There would be only a single copy released, to be auctioned off, with bidding starting at $1 million. The group also announced they would be conducting a 20-country world tour beginning in December 2014. The following day, Krazyie Bone revealed that the album would be titled E. 1999 Legends. He then told XXL that he had approached the group about a reunion album in the middle of the previous year, and they had begun recording it at the end of 2013. Krayzie estimated that Bone Thugs-n-Harmony probably recorded 75 to 100 songs since they began work on the album, which was planned as a double-disc project. The first disc was to contain Bone Thugs-n-Harmony content exclusively, with no features, and would have 18–20 songs. The second disc was planned to feature a large number of big-name guest appearances such as Mariah Carey, Kendrick Lamar, Phil Collins, Wiz Khalifa, Drake, A$AP Mob, and Linkin Park, along with beats from Dr. Dre and DJ U-Neek, who had each been tapped for the album. Damizza would be producing/overseeing the entire E. 1999 Legends album, which was projected to be distributed through Damizza's Baby Ree Records label.

On February 14, 2015, producer and long-time Bone collaborator Damizza officially presented the single "More Than Thugs". In August 2015, Krayzie announced that the first bid of at least $1 million had been received for E. 1999 Legends.

In 2017, Krayzie Bone and Bizzy Bone announced that they would release their long-awaited duet album together titled New Waves under the name Bone Thugs. The album's lead single "Coming Home" featuring Stephen Marley was released on March 24. Krayzie confirmed that the full Bone Thugs-n-Harmony group was working on a new album, but said that they would no longer be auctioning off the album's rights. All five members of the group would appear on rapper Wiz Khalifa's 2018 album Rolling Papers 2, each providing a verse for the song "Reach for the Stars." In early 2020, the group announced that they were changing their name to Boneless Thugs-n-Harmony in order to hype up a commercial for Buffalo Wild Wings. Said commercial saw "Krayzie Boneless," "Flesh Boneless," and "Wish Boneless" all facilitate the change after eating Buffalo's boneless chicken, with Layzie Bone holding out. Bizzy Bone later dismissed that the change was anything serious. 

On December 2, 2021, Bone competed in a Verzuz battle with longtime rival group Three 6 Mafia, where all five Bone Thugs and all four still-living Mafia members took part, accompanied by many guests the two groups worked with over their careers. Bizzy was escorted off stage at one point for throwing a bottle at Juicy J, but soon returned and apologized as the show resumed without incident. The event was highly acclaimed as one of the series' best events to date, seen as more of a celebration of old-school hip hop than a fight for supremacy.

Discography

Studio albums
Faces of Death (1993)
E. 1999 Eternal (1995)
The Art of War (1997)
BTNHResurrection (2000)
Thug World Order (2002)
Thug Stories (2006)
Strength & Loyalty (2007)
Uni5: The World's Enemy (2010)
The Art of War: World War III (2013)

Extended plays
Creepin on ah Come Up (1994)
Bone 4 Life (2005)

Awards and nominations

American Music Award

|-
| align="center" | 1996 || Bone Thugs-n-Harmony || rowspan="3" | Favorite Rap/Hip-Hop Artist || 
|-
| align="center" | 1997 || Bone Thugs-n-Harmony || 
|-
| align="center" | 1998 || Bone Thugs-n-Harmony || 
|-
| align="center" rowspan="2"| 2007 || Bone Thugs-n-Harmony || Favorite Rap/Hip-Hop Band, Duo or Group || 
|-
| Strength & Loyalty || Favorite Rap/Hip-Hop Album || 
|}

Grammy Award

|-
| align="center" rowspan="2" | 1996 || E. 1999 Eternal || Best Rap Album || 
|-
| align="center" | "1st of tha Month" || rowspan="2" | Best Rap Performance by a Duo or Group || 
|-
| align="center" | 1997 || "Tha Crossroads" || 
|}

MTV Video Music Award

|-
| align="center" rowspan="5" | 1996 || rowspan="5" | "Tha Crossroads" || Best Visual Effects || 
|-
| Video of the Year || 
|-
| Viewer's Choice || 
|-
| Best Group Video || 
|-
| Best Rap Video || 
|}

Soul Train Music Awards

|-
| align="center" | 1995 || Creepin on ah Come Up || rowspan="2" | Best Rap Album || 
|-
| align="center" | 1996 || E. 1999 Eternal || 
|-
| align="center" | 1997 || "Tha Crossroads" || Best Video of the Year || 
|}

References

External links

Official Facebook page

Bone Thugs-n-Harmony's ArtistDirect page
I Tried movie

1991 establishments in Ohio
MNRK Music Group artists
G-funk groups
Gangsta rap groups
Grammy Award winners for rap music
Interscope Records artists
Midwest hip hop groups
Musical groups established in 1991
Musical groups from Cleveland
Ruthless Records artists
Sibling musical groups
American contemporary R&B musical groups